Chehel Cheshmeh or Chehel Chashmeh may refer to:
 Chehel Cheshmeh, Sepidan, Fars Province
 Chehel Cheshmeh, Shiraz, Fars Province
 Chehel Cheshmeh, Isfahan
 Chehel Cheshmeh Rural District, in Kurdistan Province
 Chehel Cheshmeh-ye Gharbi Rural District, in Kurdistan Province